For the three dimensional shape, see Polyhedron

Polyhedrins are a type of viral protein that form occlusion bodies (also called polyhedra), large structures that protect the virus particles from the outside environment for extended periods until they are ingested by susceptible insects. They occur in various viruses including nuclear polyhedrosis viruses (NPVs) and granuloviruses (GVs). GVs contain one virus particle per occlusion, whereas NPVs package about 5–15 viruses in each occlusion.

References

Protein families